Cold Lake/Three Bears Landing Aerodrome  is located  south southeast of Cold Lake, Alberta, Canada.

See also
CFB Cold Lake

References

Registered aerodromes in Alberta
Municipal District of Bonnyville No. 87